Luca Spinola may refer to:
Luca Spinola (1489–1579), Doge of Genoa
Luca Spinola (1628–1715), Doge of Genoa